Thomas Lister, 4th Baron Ribblesdale (29 October 1854 – 21 October 1925) was a British Liberal politician.

Early life
Thomas Lister was born on 29 October 1854 in Fontainebleau, France, the eldest son of Thomas Lister, 3rd Baron Ribblesdale (1828–1876), and his wife Emma (née Mure) (1833–1911), daughter of William Mure. He succeeded his father in the barony in 1876.

Career
Lord Ribblesdale sat on the Liberal benches in the House of Lords and served as a Lord-in-waiting (government whip in the House of Lords) under William Ewart Gladstone from 1880 to 1885 and in 1886 and as Master of the Buckhounds under Gladstone and later Lord Rosebery from 1892 to 1895. Apart from his political career he was also a Captain in the Rifle Brigade and a Trustee of the National Gallery from 1909 to 1925.

His portrait was painted by John Singer Sargent and is said to epitomise the British aristocrat.

Personal life
On 7 April 1877, Lord Ribblesdale married Charlotte Monkton Tennant (1858–1911), daughter of Sir Charles Tennant, 1st Baronet (1823–1906) and Emma Winsloe (1849–1895), and sister of Margot Tennant, at The Savoy Chapel, London. Lady Ribblesdale died on 2 May 1911. The couple had five children:
Hon. Thomas Lister, DSO (1878–1904), a captain in the 10th Royal Hussars, who received the Distinguished Service Order (DSO) for service in the Second Boer War (1899-1902), and was killed in action during the Somaliland campaign of 1903–04.
Hon. Barbara Lister (1880–1943), who married Sir Mathew Wilson, 4th Baronet (1875–1958), and had three sons
Hon. Charles Alfred Lister (1887–1915), a second lieutenant who died from wounds received at the Battle of Gallipoli during the First World War
Hon. Laura Lister (1892–1965), who married Simon Fraser, 14th Lord Lovat (1871–1933)
Hon. Diana Lister (1893–1983), who first married Captain Percy Lyulph Wyndham, then Captain Arthur "Boy" Capel (1881–1919), and thirdly Vere Fane, 14th Earl of Westmorland (1893–1948)

On 3 June 1919, Lord Ribblesdale married secondly Ava Lowle Willing, daughter of Edward Shippen Willing and Alice Bell Barton and former wife of John Jacob Astor IV, at St Mary's, Bryanston Square in London.

He died on 21 October 1925, aged 70 at his townhouse in Grosvenor Square, Mayfair, London, and was buried in the Lister vault at St Mary the Virgin Churchyard, Gisburn, Lancashire. With his death the barony became extinct. Lady Ribblesdale died on 9 June 1958 in her apartment at 720 Park Avenue in New York City and she was buried in Trinity Church Cemetery.

Descendants
Among his grandchildren were Simon Fraser, 15th Lord Lovat and 4th Baron Lovat (1911–1995), Sir Hugh Fraser (1918–1984), the Secretary of State for Air from 1962 to 1964, David Fane, 15th Earl of Westmorland (1924–1993), Julian Fane (1927–2009), the author. The actress Georgina Ward (1941-2010) was his great-granddaughter.

Arms

References

Further reading
Kidd, Charles, Williamson, David (editors). Debrett's Peerage and Baronetage (1990 edition). New York: St Martin's Press, 1990, 

History of the Lister family

1854 births
1925 deaths
People from Fontainebleau
Politicians from Yorkshire
British people of Scottish descent
Barons Ribblesdale
People educated at Harrow School
British landowners
Rifle Brigade officers
Liberal Party (UK) Lords-in-Waiting
19th-century British politicians
Masters of the Buckhounds
Tennant family
Members of the Privy Council of the United Kingdom